Nicolas "Nico" Krämmer (born 23 October 1992) is a German professional ice hockey forward. He is currently playing for Adler Mannheim of the Deutsche Eishockey Liga (DEL).

Playing career
Krammer played two games in the DEL with ERC Ingolstadt during the 2010–11 season. The following season, Krammer spent one year abroad in the North American Junior league with the Acadie–Bathurst Titan of the Quebec Major Junior Hockey League (QMJHL). After his solitary season with the Titans, Krammer returned to his native Germany to sign with DEL outfit, the Hamburg Freezers.

After four seasons with the Freezers, the club ceased operations following the 2015–16 campaign. As a free agent on June 6, 2016, Krammer agreed to a one-year contract with his third DEL club, Kölner Haie.

Krammer played for two years with Kölner Haie, leaving at the conclusion of the 2017–18 season in agreeing to a two-year contract with Adler Mannheim on 16 April 2018.

International play
He represented Germany at the 2018 IIHF World Championship.

Career statistics

Regular season and playoffs

International

Awards and honours

References

External links
 

1992 births
Living people
Acadie–Bathurst Titan players
Adler Mannheim players
Hamburg Freezers players
ERC Ingolstadt players
German ice hockey left wingers
Kölner Haie players
Sportspeople from Landshut
Ice hockey players at the 2022 Winter Olympics
Olympic ice hockey players of Germany